Shawnee  is a city in Johnson County, Kansas, United States.  It is the seventh most populous municipality in the Kansas City metropolitan area.  As of the 2020 census, the population of the city was 67,311.

History

Territory of Kansas
Before and after the American Civil War, Shawnee served as a government road that connected Fort Leavenworth to Fort Riley.  During the mid 19th century, branches of the Oregon Trail and nearby Santa Fe Trail that travelled through, Olathe, Overland Park and Kansas City, Missouri saw settlers travel through the area. A Shawnee Indian mission had been established at the present site of Shawnee in 1831. Shawnee was laid out as a town in 1857. Kansas entered the union as a free state on January 29, 1861 to become the 34th state. The declaration of a free state, added to the tension between the anti-slave abolitionists and pro-slave Confederate guerrillas.

American Civil War
William Quantrill was a confederate Guerrilla Leader who led Confederate soldiers that were known as bushwhackers.  In October 1862, Willam Quantrill ordered an attack on Shawnee, which saw the town pillaged and burned to the ground. Quantrill and his army of bushwhackers return in the summer of 1863, to raid and look for an escape route from Lawrence, which he was intending to sack. The raids on Shawnee served as a training exercise before attempting the full scale siege on Lawrence.

Shawnee was selected by Quantrill for its proximity to Lawrence, being 35 miles away (56 kms). Lawrence was established for the political reason of being an anti-slave town and had many clashes with the confederate army started before the American Civil War. The first documented event of Bleeding Kansas was the Wakarusa War that saw both sides clash and come to a temporary truce. This allowed Lawrence to add to its defenses before the Sacking of Lawrence. In August 1863, the Lawrence Massacre took place at the hands of William Quantrill. This saw 250 men corralled and murdered and $2.2 million from damages.

Geography
Shawnee is located at  (39.012767, -94.765818).

Shawnee Mission Park is a  park that includes a  lake.

Demographics

Shawnee is the 7th largest city in the Kansas City Metropolitan Area.

According to the 2007-2009 American Community Survey (2) the median income for a household in the city was $71,705, and the median income for a family was $86,408. Males had a median income of $55,222 versus $41,960 for females. The per capita income for the city was $33,502. About 3.6% of families and 5.7% of the population were below the poverty line, including 6.0% of those under age 18 and 4.8% of those age 65 or over.

2010 census
As of the census of 2010, there were 62,209 people, 23,651 households, and 16,876 families residing in the city. The racial makeup of the city was 86.3% White, 5.3% African American, 0.4% Native American, 3.0% Asian, 0.1% Pacific Islander, 2.3% from other races, and 2.6% from two or more races. Hispanic or Latino of any race were 7.5% of the population.

There were 23,651 households, of which 36.8% had children under the age of 18 living with them, 57.7% were married couples living together, 9.8% had a female householder with no husband present, and 28.6% were non-families. 23.1% of all households were made up of individuals, and 6.0% had someone living alone who was 65 years of age or older. The average household size was 2.61 and the average family size was 3.11 persons.

In the city, the population was spread out, with 27.7% under the age of 18, 6.9% from 18 to 24, 28.7% from 25 to 44, 26.6% from 45 to 64, and 10.1% who were 65 years of age or older. The median age was 36.4 years. For every 100 females, there were 97.8 males. For every 100 females age 18 and over, there were 95.8 males.

Economy

Top employers
According to the town's 2020 Comprehensive Annual Financial Report, the top employers in the city are:

Government
Shawnee has a council–manager government.  Mayor and councilmembers are elected to four year terms.  Each ward has two representatives whose terms are staggered by two years.  However, the elections of April 2010 and 2012 will serve for three years.  The day-to-day operations are managed by the city manager.

Libraries and museums

Two branches of the Johnson County Library serves the Shawnee Mission area. The Library includes 13 locations throughout Johnson County, including the Monticello and Shawnee Libraries.
Shawnee Town 1929 Museum and Wonderscope Children's Museum are also located within the city.

Media
Shawnee is in the Kansas City, Missouri television market. The Shawnee Dispatch was a weekly newspaper published by the Lawrence Journal-World and The World Company. The Shawnee Dispatch ceased operation in November 2018.

Schools
 USD 512 Shawnee Mission School District
 USD 232 De Soto School District
 Maranatha Christian Academy
 Kansas City, Kansas Archdiocese Catholic Schools
 Midland Adventist Academy
 Hope Lutheran School

Notable people

Notable individuals who were born in and/or have lived in Shawnee include energy executive Linda Cook, former Attorney General of Kansas Phill Kline, and comedian Chris Porter.

Sister cities
  Erfurt, Thuringia, Germany
  Listowel, County Kerry, Ireland
  Pittem, Belgium

References

Further reading

External links

 City of Shawnee
 Shawnee - Directory of Public Officials
 Shawnee Area Chamber of Commerce
 Shawnee city map, KDOT

Cities in Kansas
Cities in Johnson County, Kansas
Cities in Kansas City metropolitan area
1831 establishments in Indian Territory